The squasc (pronounced ) is a mythological being of the Eastern Lombardy region folklore.

It is said to be small, hairy, tawny, similar to a squirrel without a tail, but with an anthropomorphic face.

Its nature is somehow between that of a bad spirit (assimilable to the boogeyman or Blackman) and that of an elf or imp. Like the former, the squasc is summoned to frighten children, but like the latter it loves playing jokes on people, particularly young girls.

See also 
 
 Goblin
 Gremlin
 Imp
 Kallikantzaros
 Kappa
 Lincoln Imp
 Mandragora (demon)
 Puck

References

Italian legendary creatures
Bogeymen